Mayhem is the third studio album by Irish rockabilly musician Imelda May, released on 3 September 2010 on Decca Records.

Background
Three years prior to the release of Mayhem, in 2007, Imelda May received a recording contract with Ambassador Records, a sublabel of Universal Music Ireland, and recorded her second studio album, the highly acclaimed Love Tattoo. Reaching No.1 in Ireland, the album caught the attention of Jools Holland, whom she later supported on tour, which led him to request that she appear on his well-known music show Later... with Jools Holland. Performing to an audience that included Jeff Beck, Elbow and Roots Manuva, May gained further recognition in the United Kingdom. The following year also saw May release her first two singles, "Johnny Got a Boom Boom" and "Big Bad Handsome Man", appear on several talk shows, win Female Artist of the Year 2009 at the 2009 Meteor Awards and also tour the United States.

Recording and production
After touring throughout the world promoting Love Tattoo, May took a short break before entering the studio to record Mayhem. Choosing Embassy Studios in Basingstoke, a sixteen-track analogue recording studio in a converted cow shed, May's record label Decca were "freaking out" and "drove all the way to the middle of nowhere to have a look" after hearing the studio was a cowshed. The recording of the album took two weeks in total and production was completed in late summer 2010 at Electric Mastering.

Speaking of about the recording and production of the album, May said in an interview with RTÉ: "This new album, I didn't feel any pressure on it. People have been saying to me, 'Oh it must've been hard doing another album' [but] it's what I do and it's what I love to do. The only stress I'd say that I had was convincing the record company to let me produce it, because that's unusual. I'd done quite a decent job on 'Love Tattoo' but it was very basic. I wanted it to be basic; I wanted to capture a live sound. On this one I wanted to do a bit more production on it but I didn't want to lose the charm of the last one. I wanted just to have a bit more fun with it and maybe get better mics in or better equipment in - you can hear the slap of the bass, that kind of stuff. I wanted it to be a step up but [to] not lose the plot either.

So that was my only stress, trying to convince them [the label] because they were trying to set up meetings with big shot producers and I wasn't into it at all. When they heard what I was doing - because I secretly went in and started working on it! - they were happy with it and then they backed me."

Release and promotion
Mayhem received more promotion than Love Tattoo, being better financed than its predecessor. Following performances on 30 January 2010 at the 52nd Grammy Awards with Jeff Beck and at major  music festivals, such as the Eurosonic Festival in Groningen, Netherlands, promotion for Mayhem began with the release of the first of the album's three singles, "Psycho", on 27 June. Mayhem was released in Ireland on 3 September 2010 and in the United Kingdom on 4 October 2010 after delays. Between the two release dates, the title single "Mayhem", was released on 13 September. Sneaky Freak was also released as an iTunes free single of the week on 9 September.

On the album's release night, May appeared on The Late Late Show performing the title track and being interviewed by host Ryan Tubridy and the following day performed at Electric Picnic. The following week, the album entered the charts at No.1 and Love Tattoo remained at No. 4, also going triple platinum. Less than a month later, May began a short tour of the United Kingdom which included five shows and while in London, was featured on Weekend Wogan on BBC Radio 2. Her final performance of the tour was an appearance on Later... with Jools Holland where she first gained prominence in the United Kingdom. Recorded on 12 October and broadcast on 15 October, May performed "Mayhem", "Psycho" and "Tainted Love." The same week, May also appeared as a guest on satirical pop music quiz Never Mind the Buzzcocks. Despite the extensive promotion, the album initially failed to chart in the United Kingdom.

The album's third single, "Kentish Town Waltz", was released on 15 November and the following month, May returned to Ireland. She appeared on The Saturday Night Show on 11 December and performed "Kentish Town Waltz" and "Santa Claus Is Back in Town", Following her appearance, May performed a four-night sold-out stay at Dublin's Olympia Theatre from 15 to 18 December. The album's fourth, and possibly final, single "Inside Out" was released on 16 January 2011 and Mayhem entered the United Kingdom albums chart on the same day. Two weeks later, Mayhem peaked at No. 7 in the United Kingdom charts, and is May's best-selling album to date.
An expanded version of the album entitled More Mayhem was released in September 2011, featuring six bonus tracks.

Critical reception
Mayhem received unanimous critical acclaim similar to that of Love Tattoo. Kevin Le Gendre of BBC Music described May as "an imperious, take-no-prisoners personality who can certainly electrify a tune with the tigerish yelps and whoops that run deep into the marrow of the blues", The Telegraph praised "the lyrical wit of the songs and a subtle variance in musical shading", and Caroline Sullivan of The Guardian highlighted the songs on the album, stating that "she [May] brings them to passionate, reverb-drenched life on an album that positions her as one of 2010's more interesting finds."

Track listing

Personnel
All personnel credits adapted from the album's liner notes.

The Imelda May Band
Imelda May – vocals, bodhrán
Darrel Higham – guitar
Al Gare – bass, double bass
Steve Rushton – drums, percussion
Dave Priseman – trumpet, flugel, percussion

Guest musicians
John Quinn – fiddle (on "Kentish Town Waltz")
Stewart Johnson – steel guitar (on "I'm Alive")
Olly Wilby – clarinet (on "Inside Out")
Andy Wood – trombone (on "Inside Out")
Dean Beresford – drums (on "Johnny Got a Boom Boom" remix)

Technical personnel
Imelda May – producer, mixing
Andy Wright – producer, mixing
 Andy Bradfield - Producer, mixing
Gavin Goldberg – producer, mixing
Graham Dominy – engineer
Darrel Highham – mixing
Guy Davie – mastering

Art personnel
Stylorouge – art direction, design
Front cover illustration by Mark Higenbottam
Photography by Chris Clor
Band photography by Lisa @ Cherry Bomb Rock Photography

Chart positions

Weekly charts

Year-end charts

All-time charts

Singles

Certifications and sales

Release history

References

Imelda May albums
2010 albums